Dick McCabe may refer to:
Dick McCabe (racing driver) (born 1947), NASCAR driver
Dick McCabe (baseball) (1896–1950), pitcher in Major League Baseball
Dick McCabe (American football) (1933–1983), American football player
Dick McCabe (Australian footballer) (1877–1932), Australian rules footballer
Richard McCabe (born 1960), Scottish actor